Thibodeau is a French surname. Notable people with the surname include:

David Thibodeau, musician and former member of the Branch Davidians
Joel Thibodeau, member of American folk band Death Vessel
Kenneth Thibodeau (born 1945), American specialist in electronic records management 
Michael Thibodeau, American politician and businessperson
Michèle Thibodeau-DeGuire, Canadian engineer and administrator
Sean Thibodeau, American actor
Tom Thibodeau, American basketball coach
Vanessa Thibodeau, Canadian politician
Patrick Thibodeau, American Army General https://en.m.wikipedia.org/wiki/File:Patrick_C._Thibodeau.jpg

Fictional characters:
Carter Thibodeau, from Under the Dome by Stephen King
Denise and Henry Thibodeau, from Olive Kitteridge by Elizabeth Strout

Toponyms
Thibodeau Bay, a bay of Gouin Reservoir, Quebec, Canada
Thibodeau, village in Pisiguit, Nova Scotia, Canada
Thibodaux, a city in Louisiana, formerly named Thibodeaux, in the United States

See also
Thibodeaux (disambiguation)
Thibodaux

French-language surnames